John Goodwin Gregory Peyton (1752 – 2 August 1809) was an officer in the Royal Navy during the American and French revolutionary wars. As a lieutenant, he fought alongside his father Joseph Peyton, at the Moonlight Battle off Cape St Vincent, and later, in 1798, commanded  at the Battle of the Nile. He retired a Rear admiral in 1800 and died in 1809 at the age of 56.

Early life and career

John Goodwin Gregory Peyton was born in Ardingly, Sussex in 1752 to Joseph Peyton and his wife Katherine. The Peytons were a naval family; at least five generations served and both his grandfather, Edward Peyton and his father attained the rank of admiral.

Peyton's early career is not well documented, and he is sometimes confused with other family members, but it is most likely that he is the Peyton registered aboard his father's ship, in 1766.

Command
Peyton's first command was the 12-gun cutter, in which he captured the privateer, Fantasque off Dunkirk in March 1782. He made Post on 21 January 1783 when he commissioned the newly-launched  . Peyton was assigned to another new ship in July 1794, the 38-gun , in which he served on the Irish Station.

Later, despite his seniority by 15 years, Peyton was not consulted by Nelson, prior to the search for the French fleet, leaving the naval historian, Peter Hore to wonder whether those encounters, which undoubtedly would have given Nelson an opportunity to appraise one of his captains, might have influenced that decision.

Vanguard left England on 9 April 1798 and joined the Mediterranean Fleet off Cadiz twenty days later but Peyton did not join his new command until June. Both the ship and crew were in a poor condition; Defence was overdue a refit and had one of the longest sick lists in Nelson's fleet. Scurvy, ulcers and fever were common aboard and within a month, Peyton had succumbed to sickness himself, writing so in a letter to Nelson on 3 July. Despite these problems, Defence fought hard at the Nile, engaging Peuple Souverain on 1 August for three hours before bringing down her masts and moving on to attack Franklin.

On 13 August, Peyton wrote a letter to his wife which gives one of the few surviving first-hand accounts of the Nile battle.

Later life
Peyton retired to Lymington in 1800, where he bought Priestlands, a large house with extensive grounds. He lived there with his wife, Susanna Gurnell, whom he had married in 1793, until his death, at the age of 56, on 2 August 1809. There is a memorial to him at All Saints Church, Milford on Sea.

Citations

References
 
 
 
 
 
 

Royal Navy admirals
1752 births
1809 deaths
18th-century British people
19th-century British people
People from Ardingly